Curtis Bernard Gans (June 17, 1937 – March 15, 2015) was an American activist, writer, and expert on American voting patterns.

With Allard K. Lowenstein, Gans in 1967 started and headed the Dump Johnson movement. Based on opposition to the Vietnam War, the movement, which was considered quixotic at first, grew strong and was instrumental in setting in motion events which eventually persuaded president Lyndon Johnson that continuing his campaign to be re-nominated for the presidency by his party would be difficult and divisive and uncertain of success. Johnson withdrew his candidacy, an unusual event in American politics for a sitting president.

Gans studied turnout and voting patterns for more than three decades. He co-founded and was director of the Center for the Study of the American Electorate, formerly housed at American University in Washington, D. C. Gans was commonly sought out by major American publications as an expert on voting patterns and was sometimes called on by the US State Department's Foreign Press Center to brief foreign reporters during the runup to American elections.

Additionally, he served as a consultant to the Woodrow Wilson Center for International Scholars, the National Committee for an Effective Congress, and managed a number of political campaigns. In 2015, he died at the age of 77 of lung cancer.

Bibliography

Books

Selected articles

References

External links

Transcript of 2000 interview with Gans by ABC News
Transcript of 2000 interview with Gans by CNN
Transcript of 2000 interview with Gans by PBS News

2015 deaths
1968 United States presidential election
Lyndon B. Johnson
American University faculty and staff
American political scientists
Psephologists
People from Washington, D.C.
1937 births
Deaths from cancer in Maryland
Deaths from lung cancer
People from Brooklyn
Activists from New York (state)